A barony is an administrative division of a county in Scotland, Ireland, outlying parts of England and historically France. It has a lower rank and importance than a county.

Origin
A geographic barony is a remnant from mediaeval times of the area of land held under the form of feudal land tenure termed  feudal barony, or barony by tenure,  either an English feudal barony, a Scottish feudal barony or an Irish feudal barony, which all operated under different legal and social systems. Just as modern counties are no longer under the administrative control of a noble count or earl,  geographic baronies  are generally no longer connected with feudal barons, certainly not in England where such tenure was abolished with the whole feudal system by the Tenures Abolition Act 1660. The position in Scotland is more complex, although the legal force of the Scottish feudal baron was abolished early in the 21st century.

Surviving examples

England
Two divisions of the county of Westmorland in England:
 Barony of Kendal
 Barony of Westmorland

Scotland
 Burgh of barony
 List of Scottish feudal baronies
 Prescriptive barony
 Barony of Balmore
 Barony of Cartsburn
 Barony of Cowie
 Barony of Craigie in Angus
 Barony of Dirleton
 Lordship and Barony of Hailes
 Barony of Ladyland
 Barony of MacDuff
 Barony of Mugdock
 Barony of Newton
 Barony of Peacockbank
 Barony of Plenderleith

Sweden 
 In Sweden, the only Barony of Adelswärd.

Ireland
 Barony (Ireland), a former unit of administration in Ireland, below the level of the counties and latterly not usually associated with any baronial title.

Norway
 In Norway, the only Barony of Rosendal

See also

Caput baronium, the seat of a barony in Scotland
Moot hill, the principal residence in law of a barony in England

References

Types of administrative division
Defunct types of subdivision in the United Kingdom